During the 1914–15 season Hibernian, a football club based in Edinburgh, finished tenth out of 20 clubs in the Scottish First Division.

Scottish First Division

Final League table

See also
List of Hibernian F.C. seasons

References

External links
Hibernian 1914/1915 results and fixtures, Soccerbase

Hibernian F.C. seasons
Hibernian